Niklas Lang (born 13 June 2002) is a German professional footballer who plays as a centre-back for  club 1860 Munich.

Career
Lang made his professional debut for 1860 Munich in the final of the 2019–20 Bavarian Cup on 5 September 2020, starting against Würzburger Kickers, who had been promoted from the 3. Liga to the 2. Bundesliga at the end of the season. The home match finished as a 4–1 on penalties for 1860 following a 1–1 draw after 90 minutes.

He signed a contact extension with 1860 Munich on 27 May 2022, after making his first-team breakthrough.

References

External links
 
 
 

2002 births
Living people
German footballers
Association football defenders
3. Liga players
TSV 1860 Munich II players
TSV 1860 Munich players
People from Starnberg
Footballers from Bavaria